Arab Muslims are adherents of Islam who identify linguistically, culturally, and genealogically as Arabs. Arab Muslims greatly outnumber other ethnoreligious groups in the Middle East and North Africa. Arab Muslims thus comprise the majority of the population of the Arab world.

Not all citizens of Arab-Muslim majority countries identify as Arab Muslims; many Arabs are not Muslim and most Muslims are of non-Arab ethnicity. Arab Muslims form the largest ethnic group among Muslims in the world, followed by Bengalis, and Punjabis.

Ethnogenesis 

In modern usage, the term "Arab" tends to refer to those who both carry that ethnic identity and speak Arabic as their native language. This contrasts with the narrower traditional definition, which refers to the descendants of the tribes of Arabia.

Mashriq 
The word Mashriq refers to the eastern part of the Arab world.

Arabian Peninsula 

The seventh century saw the rise of Islam as the peninsula's dominant religion. The Islamic prophet Muhammad was born in Mecca in about 570 (53 BH) and first began preaching in the city in 610, but migrated to Medina in 622. From there he and his companions united the tribes of Arabia under the banner of Islam and created a single Arab Muslim religious polity in the Arabian peninsula.

Muhammad established a new unified polity which under the subsequent Rashidun and Umayyad Caliphates saw a century of rapid expansion of Arab power, well beyond the Arabian peninsula in the form of a vast Muslim Arab Empire.

Levant 

On the eve of the Rashidun Caliphate's conquest of the Levant in the 7th century, Syria's population mainly spoke Aramaic; Greek was the official language of administration. Arabization and Islamization of Syria began in the 7th century, and it took several centuries for Islam, the Arab identity, and language to spread; the Arabs of the caliphate did not attempt to spread their language or religion in the early periods of the conquest, and formed an isolated aristocracy. The Arabs of the caliphate accommodated many new tribes in isolated areas to avoid conflict with the locals; caliph Uthman ordered his governor, Muawiyah I, to settle the new tribes away from the original population. Syrians who belonged to Monophysitic Christian denominations welcomed the peninsular Arabs as liberators.

Egypt 

Prior to the Muslim conquest of Egypt, Egypt was under Greek and Roman influence. Under the Umayyad Caliphate, Arabic became the official language in Egypt rather than Coptic or Greek. The caliphate also allowed the migration of Arab tribes to Egypt. The Muslim governor of Egypt encouraged the migration of tribes from the Arabian Peninsula to Egypt to increase the Muslim population in the region and to strengthen his regime by enlisting warrior tribesmen to his forces, encouraging them to bring their families and entire clans. The Fatimid era was the peak of Bedouin Arab tribal migrations to Egypt.

Sudan 

In the 12th century, the Arab Ja'alin tribe migrated into Nubia and Sudan and formerly occupied the country on both banks of the Nile from Khartoum to Abu Hamad. They trace their lineage to Abbas, uncle of the Islamic prophet Muhammad. They are of Arab origin, but now of mixed blood mostly with Nilo-Saharans and Nubians. Other Arab tribes migrated into Sudan in the 12th century and intermarried with the indigenous populations, forming the Sudanese Arabs. In 1846, many Arab Rashaida migrated from Hejaz in present-day Saudi Arabia into what is now Eritrea and north-east Sudan after tribal warfare had broken out in their homeland. The Rashaida of Sudan and Eritrea live in close proximity with the Beja people. Large numbers of Bani Rasheed are also found on the Arabian Peninsula. They are related to the Banu Abs tribe.

Maghreb 
The word Maghreb refers to the western part of the Arab world, including a large portion of the Sahara Desert, but excluding Egypt and Sudan, which are considered to be located in the Mashriq — the eastern part of the Arab world. 

Following the death of Prophet Mohammed in 632 (11 AH), Arabs aimed at geographically expanding their empire. They started conquering North Africa in 647, and by 709, all of North Africa was under Arab Muslim rule from Egypt to Morocco. North Africa was then divided into three main areas; Egypt with its governor center being Al-Fustat, Ifriqiya in Tunisia with its governor center being Kairouan, and the Maghreb (modern-day Algeria and Morocco), with its governor center being located in Fez. North Africa experienced three distinct invasions leading to the establishment of not only a new religion (Islam) but also a new language and norms that differed significantly from what was established by the indigenous inhabitants.

Arabic is the main language of the region, though each country (Libya,Tunisia, Morocco and Algeria) has its own dialects of the Tamazight languages and Arabic. Sunni Islam is the region’s main religion, and the Maliki Madhhab is the main Islamic school of thought followed by North Africans. The vast majority of North Africans identify as Arabs or Arab Muslims. Therefore, North Africans perceive themselves as part of the Mediterranean and the Middle East rather than Africa where they are geographically located.

Berbers 
Before the Arab-Islamic conquest took place, North Africa was mainly inhabited by Berbers. The Berbers were largely Animists until Islam reached North Africa and they were thus coerced into converting to Islam in a process known as Arabization and Islamization. Arabization refers to the process of acculturation in which the peoples of North Africa adopted the Arabic language in addition to various other aspects of Arab culture. Islamization refers to the process by which North Africans converted to Islam and thus became Muslims by faith. Though the majority of North Africans identify as Arabs today, a considerable number of the population perceive themselves as Berbers.

Diaspora 
A substantial number of Arab Muslims live outside their countries of origin. Arab Muslims comprise the majority of the Arab populations in Belgium, France, Germany, Indonesia, Iran, Israel, the Netherlands, Turkey, and the United Kingdom, whilst Arab Christians are the majority of the Arab populations in Argentina, Australia, Brazil, Chile, Colombia, Cuba, Greece, Haiti, Mexico, the United States, Uruguay, and Venezuela. Around a quarter of Arab Americans identify as Arab Muslims.

See also
 Arab Christians
 Arab Jews
 Druze
 Qahtanite
 Bahai
 Berbers

References

Bibliography